Leumorphin, also known as dynorphin B1–29, is a naturally occurring endogenous opioid peptide. Derived as a proteolytic cleavage product of residues 226-254 of prodynorphin (preproenkephalin B), leumorphin is a nonacosapeptide (29 amino acids in length) and has the sequence Tyr-Gly-Gly-Phe-Leu-Arg-Arg-Gln-Phe-Lys-Val-Val-Thr-Arg-Ser-Gln-Glu-Asp-Pro-Asn-Ala-Tyr-Ser-Gly-Glu-Leu-Phe-Asp-Ala. It can be further reduced to dynorphin B (dynorphin B-13) and dynorphin B-14 by pitrilysin metallopeptidase 1 (formerly referred to as "dynorphin-converting enzyme"), an enzyme of the endopeptidase family. Leumorphin behaves as a potent and selective κ-opioid receptor agonist, similarly to other endogenous opioid peptide derivatives of prodynorphin.

See also 
 Opioid peptide

References 

Kappa-opioid receptor agonists
Opioid peptides